Reina Guadalupe Cruz Vásquez (born 19 June 1996) is a Salvadoran footballer who plays as a defender for Houston Aces and the El Salvador women's national team.

Early life 

Born in El Salvador, Cruz moved to Texas aged twelve where she attended Nimitz High School and later Prairie View A&M University.

References

1996 births
Living people
Women's association football defenders
El Salvador women's international footballers
Salvadoran emigrants to the United States
Salvadoran women's footballers